Ahmed Amentag (1927 – November 24, 2015) was a Moroccan singer-poet (ṛṛays) and songwriter in Tashelhit.

Biography 
Ahmed Amentag was born in the village of Mentaga near Taroudant. Thus, his artistic name was Amentag which means "from Mentaga" in Tachelhit.

After leaving the madrasa in Taroudant at age 17, he joined a group of rways to play ribab for them. A few years later, he decided to found his own group of then-famous rways such as Lhadj Belaid, Omar Wahrouch, and Mohamed Demsiri.

During the 1950s, he was a famous rays and toured in France, Germany and Belgium. He made his first music recording during the later 1960s in Paris.

Legacy 
Ahmed Amentag authored several famous poems and songs such as:

 Bou salem
 Bou chahwa
 Imik ayga zin

The national festival of rways in 2017 was dedicated to him for his contributions to the musical art of rways.

Death 
Ahmed Amentag fell sick during his last years and died on Tuesday, November 24, 2015 in Dcheira El Jihadia, Morocco.

See also 

 Lhadj Belaid
 Omar Wahrouch
 Mohamed Demsiri

External links 

 News report about Ahmed Amentag in the Moroccan national TV 2M

References 

1927 births
2015 deaths
20th-century Moroccan poets
20th-century Moroccan male singers
Berber musicians
Berber poets
Moroccan songwriters
Moroccan writers
Shilha people